Prashant Tukuram Naik (born 2 September 1986) is an Indian cricketer who plays for Mumbai. He was born in Pune, Maharashtra. He was brought by Delhi Daredevils for the 2011 and the 2012 Indian Premier League. Prashant was selected for India Under 19 in the year 2005.

He started playing cricket in Pune under coach Anna Nevrekar From SSPMS day school. He Shifted to Mumbai in the 9th grade to further develop his cricket.

References

Delhi Capitals cricketers
Mumbai cricketers
Indian cricketers
1986 births
Living people